Attila Horváth may refer to:

 Attila Horváth (discus thrower) (1967–2020), Hungarian discus thrower
 Attila Horváth (footballer, born 1971), Hungarian retired international football player
 Attila Horváth (footballer, born 1988), Hungarian footballer for BFC Siófok
 Attila Horváth (handballer) (born 1966), Hungarian former international handball player
 Attila Horváth (footballer, born 2003), Slovak footballer for FC ŠTK 1914 Šamorín